Vera Markovna Orlova (May 25, 1918 – September 16, 1993) was a Soviet Russian actress.

She graduated from the Moscow theatrical school in 1942 and started to work at the Mayakovsky Theater in Moscow. In 1974, she transferred to the Lenkom Theater. At the same time, she also actively starred in cinema and provided a voice in cartoons.

For many years, she also led the Sunday radio broadcast S dobrym utrom! (Good morning!).

A serious foot disease in the mid-1980s made it difficult for her to work. She died on September 16, 1993, in Moscow and was buried on the Donskoye Cemetery.

Selected filmography
1945: The Call of Love as Liza Karasyova
1949: Happy Flight  as Fenya
1954: Two Friends as Vitya Maleyev's mother  
1954: Least We Forget as Glasha
1955: Private Ivan  as Polina
1956:  Precious Gift as Sperantova
1956: Different Fates as Nina Nikiforovna
1958: Ivan Brovkin on the State Farm    as Polina
1959: Clumsy Friend as a cafeteria attendant
1959: Rasterjaeva Street as Piskaryova
1962: Seven Nannies as Shamskaya
1966: Children of Don Quixote as Vera Bondarenko
1976: The Twelve Chairs  as Yelena Stanislavovna Bour
1976: It We Did not Pass as deputy director of vocational school
1979: With the Beloved Do not Separate as an apartment swapper
1983: Sparrow on Iceas as a door-woman

References

External links

Russian film actresses
Soviet film actresses
1918 births
1993 deaths
Honored Artists of the RSFSR
People's Artists of the RSFSR
Recipients of the Order of Friendship of Peoples
Russian stage actresses
Soviet stage actresses